Patrick Simon may refer to:
 Patrick Simon (basketball)
 Patrick Simon (politician)